Bapulapadu is a village in Krishna district of the Indian state of Andhra Pradesh. It is located in Bapulapadu mandal of Nuzvid revenue division. It is one of the villages in the mandal to be a part of Andhra Pradesh Capital Region. It is 25 km away from Gannavaram airport.

See also 
Villages in Bapulapadu mandal

References 

Villages in Krishna district
Mandal headquarters in Krishna district